Robert Beckford (born 1965) is a British academic theologian and currently Professor of Black Theology at The Queen's Foundation, whose documentaries for both the BBC and Channel 4 have caused  debate among the Christian and British religious community.

Biography
Beckford was born to Jamaican parents in Northampton, in the East Midlands of England, and was raised in a Pentecostal church. He states that his "white, middle-class" religious education teacher "turned me on in a big way to RE and sowed the seeds to think about religion and culture", while his maths tutor introduced him to politics and the work of Malcolm X, who is still a hero.

After taking A levels, Beckford studied religion and sociology at Houghton College, New York. He then studied at the London Bible College, Middlesex. After a year in the community, Beckford studied for his PhD while also working part-time at The Queen's Foundation, Birmingham, where he became Britain's first tutor in black theology.

Professionally, Beckford has spent his career in academia, beginning in 1999 as a research fellow at Birmingham University, then becoming a lecturer in African Diasporan Religions & Cultures. For two years he was Reader in Black theology and Popular Culture at Oxford Brookes University and then a visiting Professor of Sociology at Goldsmiths, University of London. Since October 2019, Beckford has been Professor of Black Theology at The Queen's Foundation, having rejoined the institution from Canterbury Christ Church University, where he was Professor of Theology and Culture in the African Diaspora.

In 2006/7 he presented shows on BBC Radio WM, first the African-Caribbean programme and then the Sunday Breakfast Show, a blend of news, interviews and chat about religious and ethical issues.

Documentaries

God is Black
In 2004, Beckford presented a documentary called God is Black, which broadcast on Channel 4, which compared white and black people's interpretation of Christianity. It was strongly criticized by conservative evangelicals in the Anglican Church who accused it of "racialising" religious issues.

Who Wrote the Bible?
In 2004, Beckford hosted a documentary called Who Wrote the Bible? broadcast on Channel 4 on Christmas Day. Beckford challenges the long-standing belief by many Christians that the Bible is the pure unadulterated word of God untouched by human hand. He seeks to demonstrate that the Bible's history involves multiple revisions, exclusions and is the result of a number of different authors.

Ghetto Britain
In 2006, Beckford made the film Ghetto Britain for the television station More 4. Through the course of the documentary, he composes a manifesto of change that he plans to put before the Commission for Racial Equality. Beckford has also made films for the BBC analysing religion and Britain's colonial history, focusing on the role of Britain's African Caribbean community.

The Passion: Films, Faith and Fury
On 15 April 2006, Beckford hosted his second one-off documentary, called The Passion: Films, Faith and Fury on Channel 4. This was Beckford's exploration of the history and the increasingly uneasy relationship between religion and the film industry, as well as the controversy that often arises as a result of any major religiously-themed film being released.

The Secret Family of Jesus
Beckford hosted a documentary called The Secret Family of Jesus on Channel 4 on Christmas Day 2006. In this documentary he explores the history and legacy of Jesus' family and presents historical evidence of Jesus' familial relationship to John the Baptist; his family unit consisting of four brothers and (at least) two sisters; his relationship with Mary Magdalene; and of Jesus' ministry being passed to his eldest brother James for the approximately 30 years prior to the destruction of the second temple and the subsequent diaspora.

The Hidden Story of Jesus
On 2007 Christmas Day, Beckford's documentary The Hidden Story of Jesus premiered on Channel 4. It investigates the parallels between Christianity and other religions, some of which predate it.

The Secrets of the Twelve Disciples
In The Secrets of the Twelve Disciples, broadcast in Easter 2008, Beckford explored Paul the Apostle's role in founding the Church and his relationship with Jesus' family; the Roman Catholic Church's claim to Saint Peter; Thomas the Apostle's travels to India; James, son of Zebedee as a patron saint of Spain; the demonisation of Judas Iscariot; and female Apostles.

The Nativity Decoded
On 2008 Christmas Day, Beckford's documentary The Nativity Decoded premiered on Channel 4. It provides an in-depth look at the nativity story, its traditions, history and meaning.

The Battle For Christianity

In 2016 he presented a programme on The Battle For Christianity. This programme explored the various ways used to help people accept Christianity including the evangelising of immigrants to the country.

Jamaican Bible Remixed

His 2017 radio programme, Jamaican Bible Remixed, about the Patois version of the Bible, was broadcast on BBC World Service, marking Jamaican Independence Day.

Bibliography

References

External links

1965 births
Living people
Black British academics
British Christian theologians
Alumni of the University of Birmingham
Houghton University alumni
Alumni of the London School of Theology
Academics of the University of Birmingham